FC Istochnik Rostov-on-Don was a Russian football team from Rostov-on-Don. It played professionally from 1993 to 1996. Their best result was 6th place in Zone 2 of the Russian Second Division in 1993.

External links
  Team history at KLISF

Association football clubs established in 1993
Association football clubs disestablished in 1996
Defunct football clubs in Russia
Sport in Rostov-on-Don
1993 establishments in Russia
1996 disestablishments in Russia